Labour Party of Bosnia and Herzegovina is a political party in Bosnia and Herzegovina based in Velika Kladuša, Una-Sana Canton in the Federation of Bosnia and Herzegovina, which serves as its main base. The party was founded in 2013 by Elvira Abdić-Jelenović, a daughter of Fikret Abdić, an influential politician and businessman from the region and convicted war criminal.

History
After Elvira Abdić-Jelenović was banned from her previous party founded by her father Fikret Abdić, the Democratic People's Union in 2013, she founded a new party with group of supporters. The Labour party of Bosnia and Herzegovina was founded on 28 December 2013 in Velika Kladuša. Abdić-Jelenović was elected first president of the party.

Electoral history

Parliamentary elections

References

2013 establishments in Bosnia and Herzegovina
Labour parties
Political parties established in 2013
Political parties in Bosnia and Herzegovina